The West Wellesley Islands, also referred to as the Forsyth Islands, is an island group and locality in the Gulf of Carpentaria within the Shire of Mornington, Queensland, Australia. The group lies to the south-west of the Wellesley Islands, closer to mainland Australia. The islands were uninhabited as of 2016.

The island group comprises:
 Forsyth Island
 Ivis Island
 Pains Island
 Bayley Island

References 

Shire of Mornington (Queensland)
Localities in Queensland
Islands of Far North Queensland
Gulf of Carpentaria